The Almabtrieb (in Switzerland: Alpabzug, Alpabfahrt, or in French speaking Switzerland: Désalpes; German language literally: drive from the mountain pasture) is an annual event in the alpine regions in Europe, referring to a cattle drive that takes place in late September or early October.

During summer, all over the alpine regions cattle herds feed on alpine pastures (Almen in Austria or Germany, Alpen in Switzerland) high up in the mountains, a practice known as transhumance. In numbers, these amount to about 500,000 in Austria, 380,000 in Switzerland, and 50,000 in Germany.

While there is often some movement of cattle between the Almen (sing.: Alm), or Alpen (sing.: Alp) respectively, during the summer, there is usually one concerted cattle drive in the autumn to bring the cattle to their barns down in the valley. If there were no accidents on the Alm during the summer, in many areas the cattle are decorated elaborately, and the cattle drive is celebrated with music, feasts and dance events in the towns and villages. Upon arrival in the valley, joint herds from multiple farmers are sorted in the Viehscheid, and each animal is returned to its owner.

In several places this Alpine custom of Almabtrieb has today evolved into a major tourist attraction, with a public festival, and booths set up along the course for selling agricultural, as well as artisans', products along with alcoholic beverages.

In the spring, the reverse cattle drive moves from the valley barns to the Alp (in Switzerland: Alpaufzug, Alpfahrt, Alpauffahrt; in Germany/Austria: Almauftrieb). It is celebrated in Switzerland. One of the first films produced in Switzerland in 1896 showed an Alpaufzug. It is not celebrated in Germany and Austria, however.

References

See also
Trailing of the sheep, an equivalent in Idaho
Transhumance
Yaylag

Folk festivals in Austria
Folk festivals in Germany
Folk festivals in Italy
Folk festivals in Switzerland